Shen Qiong (born September 5, 1981 in Shanghai) is a former male Chinese volleyball player. He was part of the silver medal winning team at the 2006 Asian Games.

He competed for Team China at the 2008 Summer Olympics in Beijing.

He is the head coach of Shanghai Volleyball Club since 2014.

References
Profile

1981 births
Living people
Olympic volleyball players of China
Volleyball players from Shanghai
Volleyball players at the 2008 Summer Olympics
Asian Games medalists in volleyball
Volleyball players at the 2006 Asian Games
Volleyball players at the 2010 Asian Games
Chinese men's volleyball players
Medalists at the 2006 Asian Games
Asian Games silver medalists for Japan
21st-century Chinese people